Zum Gali Gali is an Israeli folk song associated with the Kibbutz, Israel's collective agricultural communities. The song is sometimes referred to by the title Israeli Work Song and is known for its rhythmic style. The song begins with the repeated refrain ("zum gali gali") before proceeding to the verses. The repeated refrain itself is a nonsensical verse, and has no direct translation into English.

Overview

Origins 
The exact origins and authorship of Zum Gali Gali is unknown. While the song is associated with the Kibbutz Mishmar HaEmek it is possible that it was composed elsewhere. It may have first been performed as part of a play. The first publication of the song was in 1939 by the Hebrew Publishing Company (NY, USA), indicating it was popular among American Jews at the time. Subsequent publications, such as a 1948 recording by Meir Lokitz, recorded as part of The Stonehill Collection: Recording of Holocaust survivors and Jewish immigrants to the United States, contains alternate verses with the standard refrain. The song was first performed in a non-Jewish context by the German instrumentalist Bert Kaempfert.

Usage 

Zum Gali Gali is commonly used today in music education in both Jewish and non-Jewish settings on account of the song's rhythmic style, minor tonality, multicultural and diverse origin.

Lyrics 
Hechalutz lema'an avodah,
Avodah lema'an hechalutz

Zum gali gali gali
Zum gali gali
Zum gali gali gali
Zum gali gal

Hashalom lema'an ha'amim,
Ha'amim lema'an hashalom

Zum gali gali gali
Zum gali gali
Zum gali gali gali
Zum gali gal

See also 
 Hatikvah

References 

Israeli music
Israel
Hebrew-language songs
Jewish folk songs